The 2nd Parachute Chasseur Regiment or 2e RCP,  is one of the most decorated French units of the Second World War, the only land unit awarded the red fourragère in that war, including six citations at the orders of the armed forces. The French Navy 1500-ton class submarine Casabianca also accumulated six citations at the orders of the armed forces and therefore its crewmen were entitled to wear the same fourragère.

The unit was commonly referred to in the British Armed Forces as the 4th SAS.

Creation and naming 
 1 July 1943: creation of the 1st Air Infantry Battalion.
 1 November 1943: renamed 4th Air Infantry Battalion.
 1 April 1944: redesignated 4th SAS Regiment or 2nd Parachute Chasseur Regiment 2e RCP in the French army.
 30 September 1946: dissolution of the regiment.

History, garrisons, campaigns and battles

World War II

Unit structure 
The 1st Air Infantry Battalion (1e B.I.A) was formed July 1, 1943 in the Old Dean camp at Camberley from volunteers and from the 1st Air Infantry Company and 2nd Air Infantry Company (1e C.I.A, 2e C.I.A) formed September 15, 1940. The unit notably deployed in Crete, Tunisia and Libya, winning a citation  (Air Force).

The battalion joined the Free French Air Forces, which was entrusted to Commandant Pierre Fourcaud. At the time the battalion had 398 men, in four combat companies. These men then received parachute training  at the Central Landing Establishment (C.L.E) of RAF Ringway.

The unit was renamed the 4th Air Infantry Battalion (4e B.I.A) on November 1, 1943 and in February 1943 transferred to the command of Commandant Pierre-Louis Bourgoin, an amputee who had lost his arm during a reconnaissance mission in Tunisia. The 4e B.I.A was joined with the 3rd Parachute Chasseur Regiment (3e RCP) of Commandant Pierre Chateau-Jobert to form a demi-brigade commanded by Lieutenant-Colonel Durand.

Many French volunteers (244) followed a parachute training at the Air Instruction Center of the 1st Independent Polish Parachute Brigade at Upper Largo, in Scotland.

In April 1944, the B.I.A, who had in December 1943 joined their British and Belgian namesakes at the SAS Brigade of the Army Air Corps, were given their name and regimental designation: the 3e and 4e B.I.A became respectively the 3rd and 4th SAS regiments under the British and a little later, the 2nd (2e) and 3rd Parachute Chasseur Regiment (3e) under the French.

Operations in Brittany 

During the night of  5 to 6 June 1944, four SAS (36 men) respectively under the orders of Lieutenants Marienne, Henri Deplante, Botella and Deschamps took off in two four-engined Short Stirlings of the Royal Air Force with the destination of Brittany. The first two teams parachuted into the sector of Plumelec, 15 km from the Maquis de Saint-Marcel, Morbihan, the two other teams into the wooded forest of Duault in the Côtes-d'Armor. Their missions were to establish guerilla bases, respectively code named Operation Dingson and Operation Samwest.

Lieutenant Marienne's team was spotted. A large Georgian contingent encircled the team and during the skirmish which followed, corporal Emile Bouétard was wounded and killed. Bouétard was the first military casualty of "Operation Overlord".

During June and July, SAS paratroopers lived like hunters in the forest. Often, they mounted brutal attacks and fell back, going to ground camouflaged and blending into the forest the better to intervene at a more favourable opportunity. On the morning of 18 June, the camp of the SAS and the resistance was attacked. Following a day-long engagement, the French succeeded in retreating from Sérent  and Saint-Marcel, blowing up their ammunition depot. At dawn on 12 July, enemy troops and militias managed to infiltrate to the command post of Lieutenant Marienne at Kerihuel, Plumelec where 18 men were posted, including paratroopers, maquis and farmers, who were machine-gunned and mutilated. The arrival on August 3 of the armoured brigades of General George S. Patton reached Rennes, brought this to a halt. The 4th SAS regiment (2e RCP), lost (killed, wounded and prisoners) 23 officers and 195 men of 50 officers and 500 men (77 killed during the liberation of Brittany).

End operations 
SAS battles often have unconventional outcomes. At Montceau-les-Mines, a group of paratroopers and a first section of the Free French Forces, tricked a much larger opposing force number into believing themselves surrounded by the manpower of a division. Accordingly, they managed to take back hundreds of prisoners, tanks and cannons. At the end of the campaign, the 3rd Parachute Chasseur Regiment (3eRCP) had lost 80 of 400 soldiers. In their time of existence, the regiment put thousands of opposing forces out of combat, along with some 383 vehicles.

On Christmas Day 1944, the paratroopers of the SAS fought in the Belgian Ardennes, in Operation Von Rundstedt. On 11 November 1944, the men of the 2nd Parachute Chasseur regiment received from the hands of Général Charles de Gaulle the Croix de la Libération.

In WW2, French SAS parachutists trained in the United Kingdom wore the black beret, and the 1er RCP, trained in North Africa, kept the blue Air Army calot. All British parachutists wore an amaranth, or red, beret at the initiative of their leader, General Boy Browning.

Beginning in August 1944, French parachutists of the 2e RCP/SAS wore the amaranth beret rather than the black. The 2e RCP marched in Paris on 11 November with this headgear bearing the cap badge (beret insignia) of the SAS. During this time, the SAS parachutists of the 3e RCP and the shock troops kept the black beret.

In 1945, only the 2e RCP retained the right to wear the amaranth beret, extended to the SAS demi-brigade SAS (not at that time colonial) in 1946–1947.

On 7 April 1945, the two Parachute Chasseur regiments (770 men) parachuted into the Netherlands in (Operation Amherst).

Post-war 

On 1 August 1945, the 3rd and 4th SAS regiments, became the French 2nd and 3rd Parachute Chasseur Regiments in a transfer to the French Army. They merged to form a single 2nd Parachute Chasseur regiment (2e R.C.P), with a garrison at Tarbes. On 2 October 1945, British general Michael Calvert, commandant of the SAS Brigade, visited the regiments and bestowed on the men of the 2e RCP their respective fanions and Napoleon chapeaus, and on the 3e RCP the Wellington chapeau, a sign of friendship and fraternity in arms.

The 2nd Parachute Chasseur Regiment (2e RCP) was dissolved on 30 September 1946. Another 2e RCP, not related to the SAS, was trained and entrusted with the regimental colours and the amaranth beret. At dissolution, troops were spread across the 1st Parachute Chasseur Regiment and the 1st Shock Airborne Infantry Regiment (1er R.I.C.A.P), while the regimental colours were entrusted to the SAS Parachute Commando demi-brigade of Indochina. This commando demi-brigade went through the colonial Troupes de marine and later became the 1st Marine Infantry Parachute Regiment, (1er R.P.I.Ma), which kept the regimental colours, decorations and traditions of the 2nd Parachute Chasseur Regiment/SAS.

Traditions

Motto 
"Who dares wins" is the general motto of the SAS, translated in French to "Qui ose gagne".

Insignia

Regimental Colours

Battle honors 
The regimental colors bear painted in golden letters the following inscriptions:

 Crete 1942
 Libya 1942
 Southern Tunisia 1943
 France 1944-1945
 Ardennes in Belgium 1945
 Holland 1945
 Indochina 1946-1954

Decorations 
 Croix de la Légion d'Honneur
 Croix de Compagnon de la Libération
 Croix de guerre 1939-1945 with six palms
 Belgian Croix de Guerre
 Dutch Croix de Guerre 
 Bronze Star Medal (U.S.) 
Bears wearing :
 Fourragere bearing the colors of the Légion d'honneur (with olive 1939–45)
 Fourragère des T.O.E (Demi-brigade SAS Indochina)
 Fourragère de Compagnon de la Libération since June 18, 1996 (received by the 1er R.P.I.Ma - the heir)

Regimental Commanders 

 Captain François Coulet: 1942 (1st Air Infantry Battalion, 1er B.I.A)
 Capitaine Lambert : 1943 (1st Air Infantry Battalion, 1er B.I.A)
 Chef de bataillon Pierre Fourcaud: July 1943 (1st Air Infantry Battalion, 1er B.I.A)
 Commandant Pierre-Louis Bourgoin: November 1943 (4th Air Infantry Battalion, 4e B.I.A) 
 Commandant Pierre Puech-Samson: November 1944 (2e R.C.P)
 Lieutenant-colonel Jacques Pâris de Bollardière: 1 August 1945 (2e R.C.P)
 Colonel Reynier : 1945 (2e R.C.P - non-SAS)

Notable members of the 2nd Parachute Chasseur Regiment
Lucien Neuwirth French député, known as "father of the Pill" for his proposed law on birth control enacted in 1967. Enlisted in the 4th air infantry battalion in 1943, he fought in Brittany then parachuted into Holland, where he miraculously escaped a firing squad.
Jacques Bouffartigue, French painter
Marcel Edme, Legion of Honour recipient who served as France's most senior military adviser to the Togolese Armed Forces.

References

Sources and bibliography
 Collectif, Histoire des parachutistes français, Société de Production Littéraire, 1975.
 Qui ose gagne (France-Belgique 1943-1945, les parachutistes du 2e RCP / 4th SAS Service historique de l'armée de terre, 1997, page 296, 
 Les Bérets Rouges, Amicale des Anciens Parachutistes S.A.S., 1952, page 329
 Pierre Dufour, Chasseurs Parachutistes 1935-2005, éditions Lavauzelle, 2005 - .
 Roger Flamand, Paras de la France libre, Éditions Presses de la Cité, 1976 - .
 Olivier Porteau, L’Action combinée du 2e régiment de chasseurs parachutistes et de la Résistance bretonne dans le dispositif stratégique de l’opération Overlord, in Patrick Harismendy et Erwan Le Gall (dir.), Pour une histoire de la France Libre, Presses Universitaires de Rennes, 2012, p. 107-123
 David Portier, Les Parachutistes SAS de la France Libre 1940-1945, Éditions Nimrod, septembre 2010
 Esquisse d’un bilan réévalué de l’action des parachutistes français en Bretagne : mission militaire et/ou politique ?  Revue d'histoire contemporaine en Bretagne, n°2, été 2013, article en ligne
 Serge Vaculik, Béret rouge - Scènes de la vie des commandos parachutistes S.A.S., Éditions Arthaud, 1952.
 Franck Segrétain, Opération Amherst, avril 1945 le raid des 2e et 3e RCP sur les pays bas. Revue Ligne de front n° 24, mai-juin 2010. ISSN 1953-0544

External links
 Historique du 4e SAS sur le site France libre
 Site consacré aux parachutistes SAS de la France Libre 1940 - 1945
 Historique du 2e RCP sur le site de l'ordre de la libération

Parachute infantry regiments of France
Military units and formations established in 1943
Military units and formations disestablished in 1946